Flavia Pennetta defeated Roberta Vinci in the final, 7–6(7–4), 6–2 to win the women's singles tennis title at the 2015 US Open. It was her first major singles title, and she became the first woman to win her maiden major title after turning 30 years old. Pennetta was competing in her 49th major main draw, setting a new record for the most appearances in major main draws before reaching a final. This also marked Pennetta's last major appearance, as she retired from the sport at the end of the 2015 season. Vinci became the first unseeded woman to reach a major final since Justine Henin at the 2010 Australian Open. The final made Italy the fifth country in the Open Era to have two countrywomen contest a major final (after Australia, the United States, Belgium, and Russia). This also marked the first final with two first-time major finalists since the 2010 French Open.

Serena Williams was the three-time defending champion, but lost in the semifinals to Vinci. Williams was attempting to become the fourth woman (after Maureen Connolly, Margaret Court and Steffi Graf) to complete the Grand Slam. She was also attempting to win an Open Era record seventh US Open singles title.

This was the major main draw debut of future Australian Open champion, Sofia Kenin, who lost to Mariana Duque Mariño in the first round.

Petra Kvitová became the first player born in the 1990s to reach the quarterfinals at all four singles majors.

Seeds

Qualifying

Draw

Finals

Top half

Section 1

Section 2

Section 3

Section 4

Bottom half

Section 5

Section 6

Section 7

Section 8

Championship match statistics

References

External links
 Women's Singles main draw
2015 US Open – Women's draws and results at the International Tennis Federation

Women's Singles
US Open - Women's Singles
US Open (tennis) by year – Women's singles
2015 in women's tennis
2015 in American women's sports